Greek helmet may refer to any of the following:

 Attic helmet
 Boar's tusk helmet
 Boeotian helmet
 Chalcidian helmet
 Corinthian helmet
 Illyrian type helmet
 Kegelhelm
 Phrygian type helmet
 Pileus (hat)